Joe Cameron Pritchard (born 10 September 1996) is an English professional footballer who plays as a midfielder for Accrington Stanley.

Career
Pritchard joined the Tottenham academy in July 2013 while there he suffered a knee injury that ruled him out for a year. He was released at the end of the 2017–18 season. Following his release from Spurs, Pritchard was signed on a free transfer by Bolton Wanderers in the EFL Championship. Pritchard made his debut on 9 February 2019 against Preston North End coming on in the 77th minute in place of Craig Noone.

On 30 May 2019, Pritchard joined Accrington Stanley on a two-year deal with the option of a further 12 months. Immediately after joining, Pritchard regularly featured in Accrington's starting lineup.

Career statistics

References

External links

1996 births
Tottenham Hotspur F.C. players
Bolton Wanderers F.C. players
Accrington Stanley F.C. players
Living people
Association football midfielders
English footballers
English Football League players
Sportspeople from Watford